Alien News Desk is an American adult animated series created by Chris Prynoski and Austin Reading. The series stars Will Forte and Heidi Gardner. The series premiered on Syfy on February 27, 2019.

Plot
The series focuses on alien news anchors Drexx Drudlarr and Tuva Van Void, as they tell the news about Earth from an alien's perspective.

Cast 
Will Forte as Drexx Drudlarr
Heidi Gardner as Tuva Van Void

Episodes

References

External links
 

2010s American adult animated television series
2010s American animated comedy television series
2010s American comic science fiction television series
2010s American late-night television series
2010s American satirical television series
2010s American television news shows
2019 American television series debuts
2019 American television series endings
American adult animated comedy television series
American adult animated science fiction television series
American comic science fiction television series
American adult animated adventure television series
Animated space adventure television series
American news parodies
Animated television series about extraterrestrial life
English-language television shows
Syfy original programming
Television series by Broadway Video
American television series with live action and animation